The 2018–19 Harvard Crimson women's basketball team represents Harvard University during the 2018–19 NCAA Division I women's basketball season. The Crimson, led by thirty-seventh year head coach Kathy Delaney-Smith, play their home games at the Lavietes Pavilion and are members of the Ivy League.

Roster

Schedule

|-
!colspan=8 style=| Non-conference regular season

|-
!colspan=8 style=| Ivy League regular season

|-
!colspan=8 style=| Ivy League Tournament

|-
!colspan=8 style=| WNIT

See also
 2018–19 Harvard Crimson men's basketball team

References

Harvard
Harvard Crimson women's basketball seasons
Harvard Crimson women's basketball
Harvard Crimson women's basketball
Harvard
Harvard Crimson women's basketball
Harvard Crimson women's basketball